The 1991 Sonoma State Cossacks football team represented Sonoma State University as a member of the Northern California Athletic Conference (NCAC) during the 1991 NCAA Division II football season. Led by third-year head coach Tim Walsh, Sonoma State compiled an overall record of 9–2 with a mark of 5–0 in conference play, winning the NCAC title. The team outscored its opponents 265 to 175 for the season. The Cossacks played home games at Cossacks Stadium in Rohnert Park, California.

The nine wins and .818 winning percentage in 1991 were the best marks for the Sonoma State Cossacks football program in its 20 seasons of competition. Sonoma State's NCAC title also broke a string of 20 consecutive conference championships by UC Davis.

Schedule

Notes

References

Sonoma State
Sonoma State Cossacks football seasons
Northern California Athletic Conference football champion seasons
Sonoma State Cossacks football